The Viking Truvor (formerly Sergey Kirov) is a Dmitriy Furmanov-class (302, BiFa129M) Soviet/Russian river cruise ship, cruising in the Volga – Neva basin. The ship was built by VEB Elbewerften Boizenburg/Roßlau at their shipyard in Boizenburg, East Germany, and entered service in 1987. Her home port is currently Saint Petersburg.

Features

The ship has one restaurant “Neva” with panoramic views, two bars:  Sky Bar and Panorama Bar, observation lounge and two bars with panoramic windows, library and onboard boutique.

See also
 List of river cruise ships

References

External links
Viking Truvor
"Викинг Трувор" (экс "Сергей Киров"). Теплоход проекта 302 
Come aboard the Viking Truvor river cruise ship (formerly Viking Kirov), YouTube

1987 ships
River cruise ships
Passenger ships of Russia